The  doubles Tournament at the 2007 Porsche Tennis Grand Prix took place between 1 and 7 October on the indoor hard courts of the Porsche-Arena in Stuttgart, Germany. Květa Peschke and Rennae Stubbs won the title, defeating Chan Yung-jan and Dinara Safina in the final.

Seeds

Draw

References
 Main Draw

2007 Doubles
Porsche Tennis Grand Prix - Doubles